"Man I Hate Your Band" was the fourth single to be released by Little Man Tate. It was released on 13 November 2006, following the band's lengthy UK tour and also dates in USA and Japan. It charted at number 26 in the UK Singles Chart on 19 November 2006. The song's title is a parody of the line 'Dude, I love your band' from the D12 song, "My Band".

Track listings 
CD
 "Man I Hate Your Band"
 "Saved by a Chat Show"

7" yellow vinyl
 "Man I Hate Your Band"
 "Saved by a Chat Show"

7" white vinyl
 "Man I Hate Your Band" (Live At Boothy's)
 "75"

References

2006 singles
Little Man Tate (band) songs
2006 songs
V2 Records singles